The Bouchier Building is a historic commercial building located in Columbia, South Carolina. It was built in 1913–14, and is a three-story, terra cotta faced building with large areas of glass on the upper floors.

It was added to the National Register of Historic Places as the Building at 1722–1724 Main Street in 1979.

References

Commercial buildings on the National Register of Historic Places in South Carolina
Commercial buildings completed in 1913
Buildings and structures in Columbia, South Carolina
National Register of Historic Places in Columbia, South Carolina
1913 establishments in South Carolina